The Ferrys were a prominent Michigan and Utah family between the early 19th Century to the early 20th Century.

See also 
 Thomas W. White, Michigan Politician who was William Montague Ferry's Brother in-law.
 Brigadier General Dana Merrill, Edward Payson Ferry's son in-law.
 Malcolm A. Moody, U.S. Congressman from Oregon, Zenas Ferry Moody's son.
 William H. Ferry, a member of the New York State Senate. Rev. Ferry's cousin

References 

American families
History of Michigan
History of Utah
Political families of the United States
American Civil War
People from Mackinac Island, Michigan
People from Grand Haven, Michigan
People from Park City, Utah
People from Salt Lake City
Ferry family